Phoma eupyrena is a fungal plant pathogen infecting Douglas firs.

References

External links 
 Index Fungorum
 USDA ARS Fungal Database

Fungal conifer pathogens and diseases
eupyrena
Fungi described in 1879